Meadville is an unincorporated community in Keya Paha County, Nebraska, United States.

History
A post office was established at Meadville in 1883.   The first postmaster was Merrit I. Mead, who gave the town his name.

References

Unincorporated communities in Keya Paha County, Nebraska
Unincorporated communities in Nebraska